QT8 is a district ("quartiere") of Milan, Italy, part of the Zone 8 administrative division of the city. The name formally stands for Quartiere Triennale 8, but the district is also simply referred to as QT8.

QT8 developed from an experimental urbanization project that was conceived during the 8th edition of the Triennale di Milano design exhibition that was held in 1947, at the beginning of the reconstruction of Milan after World War II. Architect Piero Bottoni was the main promoter of the project, which included the realization of Monte Stella, an artificial hill made from the debris of the buildings that had collapsed during the war.

Construction began in 1946 and 1947, with the reuse of several heterogeneous housing units. In 1948, the first four-story prefabricated houses in Italy were completed in QT8. Much effort was put into the realization of green areas such as playgrounds, neighbourhood gardens, and a 375,000 m² city park. As a result, QT8 is one of the greenest districts in Milan.

The district is well connected to the city centre, by the Milan Metro subway as well as several bus lines.

References in popular culture
Premiata Forneria Marconi's Come ti va in riva alla città (1981) is a largely autobiographical concept album where singer-songwriter Franz Di Cioccio remembers his youth in the outskirts of Milan; QT8 is explicitly referenced in the eponymous song.

Footnotes

References
 Piero Bottoni, QT8 : quartiere sperimentale della triennale di Milano, "Edilizia Moderna", n.46 (1951). In Italian. See  
 Graziella Tonon, QT8: Urbanistica e architettura per una nuova civiltà dell'abitare, in Graziella Leyla Ciagà and Graziella Tonon (eds.), Le case nella Triennale. Dal parco al QT8, Electa, Milano 2005 - . In Italian.
 Piero Bottoni, Ascensione al Monte Stella, in Piero Bottoni, Una nuova antichissima bellezza. Scritti editi e inediti 1927-1973, ed. Graziella Tonon, Laterza 1995, pp. 457–479 - . In Italian.

Districts of Milan